Patti Lucas Bright (December 27, 1940 – September 8, 2004) was an American volleyball player. She competed at the 1964 Summer Olympics and the 1968 Summer Olympics.

References

External links
 

1940 births
2004 deaths
American women's volleyball players
Olympic volleyball players of the United States
Volleyball players at the 1964 Summer Olympics
Volleyball players at the 1968 Summer Olympics
Sportspeople from Chicago
20th-century American women
21st-century American women
Pan American Games medalists in volleyball
Pan American Games silver medalists for the United States
Medalists at the 1963 Pan American Games